Al Guest is a Canadian animation producer.

He was born in Winnipeg, Manitoba, and started his career there when he dropped out of the University of Manitoba to pursue a career in films. A writer and fine artist, he has exhibited his paintings at many galleries in Winnipeg and Toronto, Ontario. He is most known for his film work - especially animation - which he has written, produced, and directed in 10 studios on three continents.

Toronto
In Toronto he established both an animation studio and a live action production company. In the early 1960s Guest was called on by Sydney Banks, legendary Canadian broadcast and film pioneer, to help create the Directors Guild of Canada (DGC). As related by Banks, the founding President, Guest was talked into becoming its first unelected secretary and persuaded to contribute the distinctive "director's chair" logo still in use by the DGC.

Together with his partner, animator Jean Mathieson, Guest has produced more than 4,000 television commercials, theatrical shorts, television series and sponsored films, winning more than 100 awards.

Although known primarily for animation, they have also produced and directed live action commercials with their company in London, England as well as live action TV shows in the U.S. Among their live productions produced in Canada were 130 episodes of The Bonnie Prudden Show (U.S. syndication) and 195 episodes of The Ed Allen Show (U.S. syndication).

Among their animated productions produced in Canada were: 78 episodes of The Undersea Adventures of Captain Nemo, (CBS) 52 episodes of Rocket Robin Hood (CBC & international syndication), 20 episodes of The Toothbrush Family (CBS), 20 episodes of The Sunrunners (Ontario Education Channel) and 26 episodes of The Hilarious House of Frightenstein (U.S. syndication) and the half hour Inuit special Ukaliq. The Undersea Adventures of Captain Nemo ran in Quebec as Capitaine Mark Simon.

Hollywood
Subsequently, they moved to Hollywood, California where they designed and built a complete motion-control system and produced special effects for numerous commercials and the films Alligator, Any Which Way You Can, Body Heat, and One from the Heart, for which they also produced the logo animation for Francis Ford Coppola's Zoetrope Studios.

Dublin
On the recommendation and financing of their New York distributor, Don Taffner, they went to Dublin, Ireland and partnered in setting up a major animation facility, Emerald City Productions, from scratch in a country that had no animation history. Providing the design and specifications for a complete reconstruction of the premises, supervising all purchasing and installation of the equipment as well as designing the furniture, they set about to recruit and train the entire staff, from animators and background artists to camera operators and editors. The studio was set in DunLaoghaire.

While training the staff, Al Guest and Jean Mathieson wrote, produced and directed all the studio's output including the following one-hour specials based on classic books: Oliver Twist (BBC), Ghost Stories From The Pickwick Papers (Syndication), The Phantom of the Opera (HBO), Ben-Hur (Syndication), Les Miserables (HBO), A Tale of Two Cities (Syndication), The Canterville Ghost (Syndication), Around the World in Eighty Days (Syndication), The Call of the Wild (with Global Television Network, Canada), and Brer Rabbit Tales (Syndication).

Manila, Hong Kong & Guangzhou
After commuting from L.A. to their Dublin studio every six weeks for four years, they sold the studio to an English company and moved to Palm Springs. There they were commissioned by Syd Banks, to write a live action motion picture screenplay based on the life of Emily Brontë, Emily's Story - Wuthering Heights, to be produced by Denis Heroux, the producer of The Black Robe and Atlantic City.

Their animation activity did not stop however,  and they wrote, directed and produced Brer Rabbit's Xmas Carol, The Outrageous Adventures of Brer Rabbit, and Mighty Bigfoot, for which they also designed all the characters.

These productions were all made with studios in Manila and Guangzhou, China, which necessitated numerous trips to the studios by Guest & Mathieson to maintain their "hands-on" production style. The animated commercials they produced during this period were all done in L.A. on their computers.

Los Angeles
In 1998 they were appointed to the faculty of Mount San Antonio College in the new Digital Animation Production course where they taught courses in Animation Principles - Beginning and Advanced, Inbetweening, Storyboard, Layout, Animation script writing, Drawing the Figure in Motion, and CGI Environment (Maya). Although certified as professors at Mount San Antonio College, they left teaching after a year to produce and direct a trailer section of their script - Emily's Story - Wuthering Heights, as a combination live-action & CGI production.

Beijing, Shanghai, Hangzhou & Suzhou
In 2000, Guest & Mathieson spent 13 months directing and producing Flutemaster. A ground-breaking animated series originating in California and produced in China, it was a hit running Prime Time on the Chinese network CCTV, where, as one of the most popular programs ever aired, it reached an audience of 140 million viewers during its broadcast in 2004. Guest and Mathieson designed characters, the logo, and art directed the "look" of the series and its promotion. They also trained Chinese concept, storyboard, and background artists in contemporary American animation style, procedures and technical standards. Flutemaster ran in the US as Skateboy. While in Beijing they were invited to the Beijing Broadcasting Institute where they gave an address.

Back to Hollywood
They have completed a 2D series Going Buggs based on their movie Planet of the Buggs, which was created and directed by their son William S. Mathieson, as well as finishing a completely CG pilot - Oh No, Domingo!. 
A live action horror film they wrote - House of Darkness was produced in Montreal. 
A creative and business consultant in Videogames, Al Guest now devotes most of his time to writing Crime and Mafia novels.

External links

Bibliography
CARTOONS: ONE HUNDRED YEARS OF CINEMA ANIMATION by Giannalberto Bendazzi - Indiana University Press 1995
CARTOON CAPERS by Karen Mazurkewich - McArthur and Company 1999
COLOMBO'S CANADIAN REFERENCES by John Robert Colombo - Oxford University Press 1976
PRESS RELEASE - World Wide Pictures Corporation
THE ENCYCLOPEDIA OF FANTASY by John Clute and John Grant - Macmillan 1999
FRIGHT XMAS by Alan-Bertanellson Jones - AuthorHouse 2010
MORE THEATRE: M-Z by Alvin H. Marill and William T. Leonard - Scarecrow Press 1993
SELF-PORTRAIT:ESSAYS ON THE CANADIAN AND QUEBEC CINEMAS - Pierre Veronneau & Piers Handling - The Canadian Film Institute 1980
CINEMA CANADA - ISSUES 34-47 - Canadian Society of Cinematographers 1977
THE CHRISTMAS ENCYCLOPAEDIA - William D. Crump - McFarland & Co 2006
LES CINEMAS CANADIENS - Pierre Veronneau - Lherminier 1978
VOYAGE AU FOND DES MERS (French Edition) - Max Phillipe Morel - lulu.com 2012
BIBLE AND CINEMA: FIFTY KEY FILMS - Adele Reinhatz - (Routledge Key Guides) 2012
THE UNDERGROUNDS OF THE PHANTOM OF THE OPERA: SUBLIMATION AND THE GOTHIC IN LEROUX'S NOVEL AND ITS PROGENY - Jerrold E. Hogle - 2002
BEN-HUR - Lew Wallace and David Mayer - (Oxford World's Classics) - 1998

Canadian animated film directors
Canadian animated film producers
Canadian television directors
Canadian television producers
Canadian painters
Living people
Artists from Winnipeg
Film directors from Winnipeg
Year of birth missing (living people)